Dorsal digital veins may refer to:
 dorsal digital veins of the hand
 dorsal digital veins of the foot